Rolf Milser (born 28 June 1951) is a retired German weightlifter. He competed at the 1972, 1976 and 1984 Olympics, missing the 1980 Games due to their boycott by West Germany, and won the gold medal in the heavyweight I class in 1984. Milser won two world titles (in 1978 and 1984, combined with the Olympics) and set two world records in the clean & jerk, in 1976 and 1979. He also won a European title in 1979.

References

1951 births
Living people
People from Bernburg
German male weightlifters
Weightlifters at the 1972 Summer Olympics
Weightlifters at the 1976 Summer Olympics
Weightlifters at the 1984 Summer Olympics
Olympic weightlifters of West Germany
Olympic gold medalists for West Germany
Olympic medalists in weightlifting
Medalists at the 1984 Summer Olympics
World Weightlifting Championships medalists
Sportspeople from Saxony-Anhalt